Kropyvnytskyi is a city in central Ukraine on the Inhul river with a population of . It is an administrative center of the Kirovohrad Oblast.

Over its history, Kropyvnytskyi has changed its name several times. The settlement was known as Yelysavethrad after Empress Elizabeth of Russia from 1752 to 1924 as well as simply Elysavet. In 1924 it became Zinovievsk in honour of the Bolshevik revolutionary and Politburo member Grigory Zinoviev (1883-1936), who was born there. Following the assassination of the First Secretary of the Leningrad City Committee of the All-Union Communist Party (Bolsheviks) Sergei Kirov (in office 1926–1934), the town was renamed Kirovo in Kirov's honour on 7 December, 1934—a name-change similar to those of numerous other localities throughout the USSR (including present-day Kirov in Kirov Oblast, Kirovakan, Kirovabad, as well as multiple instances of Kirovsk, Kirovo, Kirovsky and other derivatives).

Concurrently with the formation of the Kirovohrad Oblast on 10 January, 1939, and to distinguish it from the Kirov Oblast in central Russia, Kirovo was renamed Kirovohrad, a name it maintained until 2016. Due to mandated decommunization the name of the city then changed to Kropyvnytskyi, in honour of the writer, actor and playwright Marko Kropyvnytskyi (1840–1910), who was born near the city. However the Kirovohrad Oblast was not renamed because it is mentioned in the Constitution of Ukraine – only a constitutional amendment could change the name of the oblast.

During the Ukrainian presidential election of 2004 the city achieved country-wide notoriety due to mass election fraud committed by local authorities and after that became known as District 100 (its community number according to the Central Elections Committee). Notable figures born in the city include Grigory Zinoviev, Volodymyr Vynnychenko, Arseny Tarkovsky, Afrikan Spir, Marko Kropyvnytskyi, and others.

Name origins

Yelisavetgrad 

The name "Yelisavetgrad" (usually spelled Elisavetgrad or Elizabethgrad in English language publications) is believed to have evolved as the amalgamation of the fortress name and the common Eastern Slavonic element "-grad" (Old/Church Slavonic "градъ", "a settlement encompassed by a wall"). Its first documented usage dates back to 1764, when Yelisavetgrad Province was organized together with the Yelisavetgrad Lancer Regiment.

Presenting a letter of grant on January 11, 1752, to Major-General Jovan Horvat, the organizer of New Serbia settlements, Empress Elizabeth of Russia ordered "to found an earthen fortress and name it Fort St. Elizabeth" (see On the Historical Meaning of the Name Elizabeth for Our City ) (in Ukrainian). Thus simultaneously the future city was named in honour of its formal founder, the Russian empress, and also in honor of her heavenly patroness, St. Elizabeth.

Zinovievsk 

Following the Russian Revolution and founding of the Soviet Union, in 1924 the city was renamed Zinovievsk, after Grigory Zinoviev, a Soviet statesman and one of the leaders of the Russian Communist Party (Bolsheviks). He was born in Yelisavetgrad on September 20 (September 8 O.S.), 1883. At the time he was honored by the name, he was a member of the Politburo and the Chairman of the Comintern's Executive Committee.

Kirovo and Kirovograd 

On December 27, 1934, after the assassination of Sergei Kirov, Zinovievsk and other Soviet cities was renamed again - this time as Kirovo, and then as Kirovohrad. The latter name appeared simultaneously with the creation of Kirovograd Oblast, on January 10, 1939 and was aimed at differentiating the region from Kirov Oblast in present-day Russia.

After Ukraine regained independence, the name of the city started to be spelled according to Ukrainian pronunciation as Kirovohrad. The previous Russified orthography remains widely used on account of the widespread use of the Russian language in the region.

Kropyvnytskyi 

Since 1991 numerous discussions had been held on the city's name. A number of activists supported returning the city to its original name, Yelisavetgrad (or now Yelysavethrad in Ukrainian transcription). Other suggestions for contemporary Ukraine included Tobilevychi (in honour of the Tobilevych family, the Coryphaei of the classic Ukrainian drama established in Yelysavethrad in 1882); Zlatopil, from Ukrainian "золоте поле", literally "golden field"; and Stepohrad, Ukrainian for "city of steppes" (in recognition of the agricultural status of the city); Ukrayinsk or Ukrayinoslav, i.e. "the glorifying Ukraine one;" and Novokozachyn (to commemorate the semi-famous Cossack regiment which could have been quartered at the present-day city location).

The President of Ukraine, Petro Poroshenko, signed the bill banning Communist symbols on May 15, 2015, which required places associated with communism to be renamed within a six-month period. On 25 October 2015 (during local elections) 76.6% of the Kirovohrad voters voted for renaming the city to Yelisavetgrad. A draft law at the time before the Ukrainian parliament would prohibit any names associated with Russian history since the 14th century, which would make the name Yelisavetgrad inadmissible as well. A committee of the Verkhovna Rada (Ukraine's parliament) chose the name Inhulsk on 23 December 2015. This name is a reference to the nearby Inhul river. On 31 March 2016 the State Construction, Regional Policy and the Local help committee of the Verkhovna Rada recommended to parliament to rename Kirovohrad to Kropyvnytskyi. This name is a reference to writer, actor and playwright Marko Kropyvnytskyi, who was born near the city. On 14 July 2016, the name of the city was finally changed to Kropyvnytskyi.

Administrative status

Kropyvnytskyi serves as administrative center of Kropyvnytskyi Raion and hosts the administration of Kropyvnytskyi urban hromada, one of the hromadas of Ukraine. 

Until 18 July 2020, Kropyvnytskyi was designated as a city of oblast significance and belonged to Kropyvnytskyi Municipality but not to Kropyvnytskyi Raion even though it was the center of the raion. It is divided into two districts — Fortechnyi and Podilskyi. The urban-type settlement of Nove is part of the Fortechnyi district. As part of the administrative reform of Ukraine, which reduced the number of raions of Kirovohrad Oblast to four, Kropyvnytskyi Municipality was merged into Kropyvnytskyi Raion.

History

18th and 19th century: from military settlement to trade centre 

The history of the city beginnings dates back to the year 1754 when Fort St. Elizabeth was built on the lands of former Zaporizka Sich in the upper course of the Inhul, Suhokleya and Biyanka Rivers. The fort was built in 1754 by the will of the empress Elizabeth of Russia and it played a pivotal role in the new lands added to Russia by the Belgrad Peace Treaty of 1739. In 1764 the settlement received status of the center of the Elizabeth province, and in 1784 the status of chief town of a district, when it was renamed after the fort as Yelyzavethrad.

The Fort of St. Elizabeth was on a crossroads of trade routes, and it eventually became a major trade center. The city has held regular fairs four times a year. Merchants from all over the Russian Empire have visited these fairs. Also, there were numerous foreign merchants, especially from Greece. Developed around the military settlement, the city rose to prominence in the 19th century when it became an important trade centre, as well as a Ukrainian cultural leader with the first professional theatrical company in either Central or Eastern Ukraine being established here in 1882, founded by Mark Kropyvnytsky, Tobilevych brothers and Maria Zankovetska.

Early 20th century: famine and pogroms 

Elizabethgrad was ravaged by famine in 1901 and its residents suffered more due to poor government response. The region is extremely fertile. However, a drought in 1892 and poor farming methods which never allowed the soil to recover, prompted a large famine that plagued the region. According to a 1901 New York Times article, the Ministry of the Interior denied the persistence of famine in the region and blocked non-State charities from bringing aid to the area. The reporter wrote, "The existence of famine was inconvenient at a time when negotiations were pending for foreign loans." The governor of the Kherson region, Prince Oblonsky, refused to acknowledge this famine. One non-resident and non-State worker entered Elizabethgrad and provided The New York Times with an eyewitness account. He observed: general and acute destitution; deaths from starvation; widespread typhus (shows poverty), and little to no work to be found in the region.

Elizabethgrad was located in the Pale of Settlement and, during the 19th century, had a substantial Jewish population.

Elizabethgrad was subjected to several violent pogroms in the late 19th and early 20th century. In 1905 another riot flared, with Christians killing Jews and plundering the Jewish quarter. A contemporary account was reported in The New York Times on December 13, 1905.

Russian revolution and civil war 

During the Russian Civil War, the city witnessed intense fighting.

On 7 May 1919, paramilitary leader, and former divisional general in the Red Army, Nykyfor Hryhoriv, launched an anti-Bolshevik uprising. On 8 May 1919, he issued a proclamation "To the Ukrainian People" (До Українського народу), in which he called upon the Ukrainian people to rise against the "Communist imposters", singling out the "Jewish commissars" and the Cheka. In only a few weeks, Hryhoriv's troops perpetrated 148 pogroms, the deadliest of which resulted in the massacre of upwards of 1,000 Jewish people in Yelisavetgrad, from 15 to 17 May 1919. In total, about 3,000 Jews died in the city.

The Soviet Red Army eventually reconquered the city in 1920.

Soviet rule 
During Soviet rule, the city economy was dominated by such enterprises as Chervona Zirka Agricultural Machinery Plant (current name Elvorti; which once provided more than 50% of the USSR need in tractor seeders), Hydrosila Hydraulic Units Plant, Radiy Radio Component Plant, Pishmash Typewriter Plant (de facto defunct nowadays) and others.

In World War II Kropyvnytskyi was occupied by Nazi Germany from 5 August 1941. It was subsequently recaptured by Soviet forces on 8 January 1944.

Geography
The city is in the center of Ukraine and within the Dnieper Upland. The Inhul river flows through Kropyvnytskyi. Within the city, several other smaller rivers and brooks runs in the Inhul; they include the Suhoklia and the Biyanka.

Urban layout
The city began as a settlement built in adjustment to a fortress called "Yelizaveta Fortress". At the end of 1757, the earthen fortifications were almost ready. Only the internal layout has changed, retaining its dimensions (55x55 sazhens). North of the fortress of St. Elizabeth, behind a small ravine on the banks of the Ingul, a soldier's settlement arose under the name of Grechesky or Bykovo, named after captain Bykov who was the commandant of the fortress. The main streets of Bykovo were Nizhne-Bykovskaya (Pushkin St.). Verkhne-Bykovaya (Chapaeva), Ostrovskaya, Vasilievskaya, Andreevskaya (retained its original name), Artem, Kakhovskaya, Tobilevich, Pushkina Lane, Znamensky, and Sibirskaya.

To the east of the fortress, the Permskoye suburb appeared. It got its name from the camp of the Perm (Carabinieri) Regiment, called in 1754 to cover the working people and eradicate the Gaidamaks. Permskoye was located between the river and the esplanade zone, it was a small residential area, numbering a dozen blocks with straight streets and lanes. The main streets of Perm were - (Bolshaya Permskaya), Fisanovich, Sverdlov, Bobrinetskaya, Gorky, International, lanes Krepostnoy, Postal, Ogorodny.

Soon, buildings appeared on the other side of the Ingul. This part of the settlement was called Podil and is today forming the central part of the city. The drawings of 1762 indicate that a large residential area arose here, cut by streets 10-12 sazhens wide into a grid of square and rectangular quarters. It became the core of a rapidly growing village. The main streets on Podil were Marksa Street (Bolshaya Perspektivnaya, Nikolaevsky Prospekt), Dzerzhinskya (Moskovskaya), Lenina (Dvortsovaya, Verkhne-Donskaya), Timiryazeva (Nizhne-Donskaya), Gogola (Uspenskaya), K. Liebknecht (Preobrazhenskaya, Merchant ), R. Luxembourg, (Pokrovskaya), Kalinina (Mirgorodskaya), Decembrists (Ingulskad), Company (Nevskaya, Pashutinskaya), Volodarsky (Aleksandrovskaya), Kirov (Mikhailovskaya), Krasnogvardeiskaya (Arkhangelskaya), Karabinernaya (retained its original name).

While Bykovo and Permsky quarters were built up by the headquarters department for soldiers and officers, then in Podil they are occupied by houses of merchants and artisans. The settlements of Kovalevka and Balka, apparently founded by the Cossacks, adjoined the outskirts (in the territory of the modern part of the Balka, there is still a lane called Cossack). These settlements, which eventually merged with the suburban development into a single planning structure, initially had a picturesque, free tracing of the street network. But, if over time the layout of the Balka was subjected to only partial regulation, then only small fragments remained of the original layout of Kovalevka (Bebel St., Transportnaya St., Molodezhny Lane).

Almost simultaneously with the appearance of the suburb, the following were built: the city market (on the site of an existing shopping center), the wooden Assumption Church (on the site of the regional committee of the Communist Party of Ukraine), the wooden Vladimirskaya (Greek Church), the wooden Znamenskaya Church (on Bykovo), the schismatic prayer house. These objects with ordinary, mainly wooden manor buildings, as well as with fortress structures, determined the appearance of the city in the first ten years of its development.

The planning architectural and spatial composition of the central part of the settlement consisted in the hierarchical subordination of its main street (B. Perspektivnaya, K. Marksa) with the square on it and ordinary low-rise buildings. Among this development, public houses and shops were sharp accents, and the Assumption and Vladimir churches served as dominants. The street served as the main axis of the entire composition. It divided the suburb into two equal parts and the direction of its route almost coincided with the center of the fortress. Thus, the fortress with the church in it turned into the third main dominant of the street, although it was located outside its boundaries.

In plan, the area was rectangular with an aspect ratio of 1:3 (50x150 m.). On one of the smaller sides, it adjoined the main street (Bolshaya Perspektivnaya), and on the wide side it adjoined the market and a small quarter, like the square, which is now included in the territory of the market.

From the side of the market on the square there were a gostiny dvor and butcher shops, and on the opposite and smaller sides - public buildings. Within the retranchement, the city occupied an area of 2.3 sq. km. (1.8 x 1.5 km.). From the period of the formation of the city the fortress of St. Elizabeth was the town-planning core of the settlement, the place of concentration or attraction of all its main functions. The central administrative function was concentrated in the fortress. This is the administrative management of the fortress, the subordination of the chiefs of the suburbs and settlements to the commandant of the fortress, the presence in it of the regimental office of the Cossack regiment. The religious center was also located in the fortress of St. Elizabeth, the Trinity Cathedral Church (ruined in 1813). The central trading function also gravitated towards the fortress. Its place of concentration is the main square. The trade function developed with the settlement of lands by artisans and merchants. And their appearance was due to the need to service military units inside a large fortress.

Soviet period
Prallel to the Biayanka river, new streets were formed in the settlement of Balka. New quarters have grown in the village. Kushchevka, Novo-Alekseevka. Former village Balashovka merged with the city and organically entered its planning structure. In 1930, a general plan for the development of the city was developed. According to this plan, on the site of the square in front of the former town hall, the main square of the city was formed with a monument to Kirov in its center. In the 50s, The construction of 2-storey buildings began in the areas of Lunacharskogo and Mira streets. Also in the late 40s - early 50s. 3, 5-storey houses are being built on the Marksa Street. From the 60s, construction of massive housing estates was commenced, with Cheryomushki located in the south-west of the city being first such district, designed according to the plan of architect A.A. Sidorenko. Such housing estate was constructed also in Novo-Nikolaevka District. New master plan for the city was developed by the Kharkiv Institute Ukrgorstroyproekt, taking into account the placement of a residential multi-storey buildings in the new territories of the south-west. New residential areas were built along Heroyev Ukrainy Street (formerly Volkova Street). In the 60s, the industrial district along Balashovsky district was developed.

Architecture

From 1878 to 1905 Oleksandr Pashutin served as mayor of the city. Under his administration, advances were made in the areas of education and medicine, construction of the water-supply system and several public buildings, the introduction of the first tram and the establishment of numerous marketplaces. Kropyvnytskyi is noted for the quality of its architecture, with European-style sculptures and antique windows. A range of classical and modern monuments, Moorish and Baroque palaces, and buildings that combine Gothic, Rococo and Renaissance motives are extant to this day. Today a high level of building technology of Kropyvnytskyi's masters encourages further construction and restoration.

Symbols
Three blue stripes crossed in the middle of the fortress plan symbolize the fortification location at the confluence of the Inhul, Suhukleya and Biyanka rivers. The crimson colour favoured by Cossacks refers to the fortress being situated on the lands of the Zaporozhian Cossacks. Golden ears together with a golden field on the shield are symbols of the fertile lands and notable agricultural wealth of the region.

The shield is held by storks, which symbolizes happiness, fertility, and love for the native land. The golden tower in the form of a crown expresses that the city is a regional centre. The motto "With peace and good" placed on the azure stripe emphasizes that same idea. All the features of the flag correlate with the principal elements of the escutcheon on the coat of arms of the city.

Demography
2001 Ukrainian census
 85.8% - Ukrainians
 12.0% - Russians
 0.5% - Belarusians
 1.7% - others

Historical dynamic

Notable people

The history of Kropyvnytskyi boasts memorable events and appearances in the biographies of famous people. One of the unsurpassed creators of the modern architectural ensemble of the historical centre of the city of Kropyvnytskyi,  was born and lived here. Such noted architects as A. Dostoyevskyi and  worked there as well.
P. Kalnyshevsky fought for the freedom of the local cossacks, M. Pirohov laid the foundation of field surgery and M. Kutuzov planned his military operations from the city.
Natives listened to the lectures of the outstanding slavist , and inherited the knowledge of the land from the ethnographer, historian and archeologist .

In different periods of time the history of the region was connected with the names of the famous Ukrainian writer, playwright, publicist and statesman Volodymyr Vynnychenko, the poet, literary and cultural critic Y. Malanyuk, the physicist-theoretician, the Nobel Prize laureate Igor Tamm, the scientist and inventor, one of the creators of the legendary "Katyusha" G. Langeman, the composer Yuliy Meitus, the pianist and pedagogue G. Neigauz, the artist and painter O. Osmiorkin, the poet and translator Arseny Tarkovsky, the public and cultural figure, memoirist, patron of the arts Y. Chykalenko, the composer, pianist, pedagogue, musician and publicist K. Shymanovskyi and the Ukrainian writer, dramatist and scriptwriter Y. Yanovskyi.

 
Irina Belotelkin (1913–2009) a Russian-American artist and fashion designer.
Felix Blumenfeld (1863–1931) a Russian and Soviet composer, conductor and pianist
Aaron Bodansky (1887–1960), a Russian-born American biochemist
Israel Fisanovich (1914–1944), a Soviet Navy submarine commander 
Moses Gomberg (1866–1947), a chemistry professor at the University of Michigan.
Boris Hessen (1893–1936), a Soviet physicist, philosopher and historian of science.
Boris Kotlyarov (1913-1982), a Soviet ethnomusicologist and violinist
Zevulun "Zavel" Kwartin (1874-1952), Jewish cantor and composer
Heinrich Neuhaus (1888–1964), Russian pianist of German and Polish descent
Yury Olesha (1899–1960), a Russian and Soviet writer and novelist.
Victor Orly (born 1962), a contemporary French painter
Platon Poretsky (1846–1907), Russian Imperial astronomer, mathematician and logician
Issachar Ber Ryback (1897–1935), a Jewish-Ukrainian-French painter and sculptor
Afrikan Spir (1837–1890), a Russian neo-Kantian philosopher of German-Greek descent 
Arseny Tarkovsky (1907–1989), Russian poet
Alexander Zaldostanov (born 1963), leader of the Night Wolves; Russia's largest motorcycle club
Grigory Zinoviev (1883–1936), Bolshevik revolutionary and a prominent member of the CPSU
Ivan Olinsky (1878-1962), a Jewish-Ukrainian and American painter and art instructor in New York and Connecticut

Sport 

Olesya Dudnik (born 1974) a gymnastics coach and former artistic gymnast
Grigory Gamarnik (1929–2018), Soviet wrestler, Greco-Roman world champion
Andrei Kanchelskis (born 1969), footballer with 456 club caps and 36 for Russia
Yevhen Konoplyanka (born 1989), footballer with 275 club caps and 86 for Ukraine
Dmytro Mykhaylenko (born 1973), footballer with 376 club caps and 23 for Ukraine
Serhiy Nazarenko (born 1980), footballer with 375 club caps and 56 for Ukraine
Maurice Podoloff (1890–1985), American Hockey League and National Basketball Association administrator
Valeriy Porkujan (born 1944), footballer with 240 club caps and 8 for the Soviet Union
Andriy Rusol (born 1983), footballer with 252 club caps and 49 for Ukraine
Alexei Suetin (1926–2001), Russian chess grandmaster and author

Climate
Kropyvnytskyi is in the central region of Ukraine.
Kropyvnytskyi's climate is moderate continental: cold and snowy winters, and hot summers.

See also
 Kropyvnytskyi Region Universal Research Library
 Remember about the Gas — Do not buy Russian goods!

References

External links

Kropyvnytskyi Daily News 
Bez Kupur - News of Kropyvnytskyi and Kirovohrad region without limits on the truth (in Ukrainian)
Online magazine for young people - "Grechka". News about the cultural life of Kropyvnytskyi young people and Kropyvnytskyi region young people.
Kropyvnytskyi's portal: photos, news, information, etc. 
Kropyvnytskyi news, history of the city, photos, science. 
Kropyvnytskyi events, history of the city, photos, news and chats with citizen 

 
Cities in Kirovohrad Oblast
Cities of regional significance in Ukraine
Oblast centers in Ukraine
1754 establishments in the Russian Empire
Populated places established in the Russian Empire
Populated places established in 1754
Yelisavetgradsky Uyezd
City name changes in the Soviet Union
Former Soviet toponymy in Ukraine
City name changes in Ukraine